This is a discography of American blues rock band North Mississippi Allstars.

Studio albums

Extended plays

Live albums

Compilation albums

Video albums

Guest appearances

References

Rock music group discographies
Discographies of American artists